Hamid Nater (born 30 December 1980) is a Moroccan football midfielder who plays for Raja Casablanca.

Nater played for Raja at the 2000 FIFA Club World Cup.

Nater played for Morocco at the 2000 Summer Olympics in Australia.

References

1980 births
Living people
Moroccan footballers
Olympic footballers of Morocco
Footballers at the 2000 Summer Olympics
Association football midfielders
Raja CA players
AS FAR (football) players